Dizaj-e Aqa Hasan (also Romanized as Dīzaj-e Āqā Ḩasan; also known as Dīzaj-e Āqā Ḩoseyn) is a village in Qazi Jahan Rural District, Howmeh District, Azarshahr County, East Azerbaijan Province, Iran. At the 2006 census, its population was 237, in 66 families.

References 

Populated places in Azarshahr County